The 2016–17 season of the Niedersachsenliga is the ninth season of the league at tier five (V) in the German football league system and the 27th overall.

2016–17 standings 										
The 2016–17 season saw five new clubs in the league, MTV Gifhorn, Hannoverscher SC, Blau-Weiß Bornreihe and TuS Bersenbrück, all four promoted from the Landesligas, while BV Cloppenburg was relegated from the Regionalliga Nord.

Top goalscorers
The top goal scorers for the season:

Promotion play-off 
Promotion play-off were to be held at the end of the season to the Regionalliga Nord. The runners-up of the Niedersachsenliga and the champions or, in Hamburg's case, the best-placed team applying for a licence, of the Bremen-Liga, Oberliga Hamburg and Schleswig-Holstein-Liga played each other for two more spot in the Regionalliga. In the promotion round each team met the other just once with the two highest-placed teams in the final table promoted, however the final two matches were deemed obsolete and played as friendly matches because the two promoted teams had already been determined.

References 

Niedersachsen
Niedersachsenliga